The National Marine Aquarium, opened in May 1998, in Britain's Ocean City Plymouth is the largest Aquarium in the UK. It is home to over 4,000 animals and acts as an educational institution, teaching visitors about marine environments. The National Marine Aquarium has also engaged in ocean conservation work. 

The marine aquarium is located in Sutton Harbor, next to the Barbican and fish market. It is a member of the British and Irish Association of Zoos and Aquariums (BIAZA).

Exhibits

The Aquarium is divided into four main zones: Plymouth Sound, British Coasts, Atlantic Ocean and Blue Planet.

Plymouth Sound 
This zone displays marine life found around Plymouth. It concentrates on the range of habitats found around the city. There are 17 tanks, which are home to approximately 80 species of fish and invertebrates, including local sharks, rays, seahorse and octopus.

Eddystone Reef 
The second exhibit is the largest native offering in Britain, housing life-size models of whales and dolphins located around Britain. The large Eddystone tank displays an array of creatures found on the Eddystone reef, 19 km south of Plymouth. Through a huge window, visitors can see conger eels, mullet(fish), pollack, bream, and smooth hound sharks swimming in the open water, flatfish and rays hiding on the seabed, and lobsters and crabs hiding in the rocks.

Atlantic Ocean 
This zone contains various areas within, including 'Ocean Drifters', 'Ocean Lab', 'Observation Deck', 'Lost at Sea' and 'Ocean Predators'. The 'Ocean Drifters' jellyfish exhibit was opened in 2009, and includes moon jellies, Japanese sea nettles, and Upside-down jellyfish, housed in round tanks to prevent damage to their delicate bodies. The other areas take you around the largest tank of the aquarium housing 1,000 Caribbean fish including nurse shark, lemon shark, sand tiger shark, zebra shark, sandbar shark, barracuda, southern stingray, tarpon, turtle. The tank volume is 2.5 million litres. This exhibit was updated at the end of 2009, with the largest ever shipment of live fish into the UK, from Barbados, West Indies. It was updated again in 2015/16 with the addition of Lemon and sand-tiger sharks.

The Laboratory 
The Laboratory allows you to see what life is like working behind the scenes at the aquarium. Biologists can be seen taking care of the younger generation of species being bred and cared for before entering the main exhibits.

Blue Planet 
This zone includes 'Biozone' and the 'Great Barrier Reef'.  Biozone showcases the amazing biodiversity found in the world's oceans and displays species such as the longhorn cowfish, lionfish, Giant Pacific Octopus Enteroctopus dofleini and seahorses. This zone also includes the second largest tank at 700,000 liters, home to over 70 species of fish. It also was the home of the loggerhead sea turtle, Snorkel, who was with the aquarium from 1990 to 2016.

Conservation

The National Marine Museum led a project to sink frigate  in 2004 to create an artificial reef in Whitsand Bay, Cornwall. 

It is the lead partner in Just Add H2O, a schools learning center offering outreach programs based on the National Curriculum. 

Through National Marine Aquarium grants, smaller charities can further help with driving marine conservation.

References

External links 

Aquaria in England
Buildings and structures in Plymouth, Devon
Oceanaria
Tourist attractions in Plymouth, Devon
Wind power in England
Wind power in the United Kingdom